The 2022 NHL Winter Classic was an outdoor ice hockey game played in the National Hockey League (NHL) on January 1, 2022, at Target Field in Minneapolis, Minnesota. The 13th edition of the Winter Classic, it matched the St. Louis Blues against the Minnesota Wild; the Blues won, 6–4. The game was originally scheduled for 2021 but was postponed a year due to the COVID-19 pandemic.

Background
The NHL announced on January 1, 2020, that the 2021 Winter Classic would be hosted by the Minnesota Wild at Target Field. The league then announced on February 23, 2020, that the St. Louis Blues would be the visiting team. The league had previously contemplated Target Field as a host for a Winter Classic game, touring the stadium both in 2018 and 2019, and observing how the area hosted the NCAA Final Four in 2019. It was to be the Wild's second outdoor game after hosting the 2016 NHL Stadium Series against the Chicago Blackhawks at TCF Bank Stadium. This was also to be the Blues' second outdoor game after hosting the 2017 NHL Winter Classic against the Blackhawks at Busch Stadium.

The NHL delayed the start of the 2020–21 season to January 2021, due to the COVID-19 pandemic having forced the 2019–20 playoffs to conclude in late-September. If the Winter Classic were to be held, it would have likely served as the season opener for both teams. On October 22, 2020, the NHL announced that the 2021 Winter Classic, and the 2021 All-Star Game in Sunrise, Florida, had been postponed due to "uncertainty as to when we will be able to welcome our fans back to our games," as fan participation and accompanying events are considered "integral to the[ir] success." The NHL stated that both events would not return until 2022 at the earliest, and that these events could be held in Minneapolis and Sunrise "in the near future" (but not yet naming them the 2022 hosts).

On June 28, 2021, the league confirmed that the Winter Classic between the Blues and the Wild at Target Field would be scheduled for 2022. The league further announced on September 27, 2021, that it would be the first Winter Classic scheduled for primetime, avoiding a repeat of the sunlight and heat issues that occurred during the previous season's NHL Outdoors at Lake Tahoe.

With various December 2021 games being postponed league-wide due to COVID-19 outbreaks among a large number of teams, the NHL remained adamant about holding the Winter Classic as scheduled.

Game summary

Number in parenthesis represents the player's total in goals or assists to that point of the season

Team rosters

 Ville Husso dressed as the back-up goaltender for St. Louis and did not enter the game.

Scratches
St. Louis Blues: Robert Bortuzzo, Jake Walman
Minnesota Wild: Jonas Brodin, Joel Eriksson Ek

Entertainment
Singers of This Age, a group of Minneapolis–Saint Paul high school students, performed the national anthem. Minnesota sports stars were then introduced, including Rachel Banham of the Minnesota Lynx, former Minnesota Timberwolves player Troy Hudson, and former Minnesota Vikings player John Randle. Former Minnesota Twins players Justin Morneau, Joe Mauer, Kent Hrbek, and Tony Oliva participated in the ceremonial puck drop. Country music singer Thomas Rhett performed during the first intermission. The roster for the U.S. Olympic women's ice hockey team competing at the 2022 Winter Olympics was revealed during the second intermission.

Broadcasting
In April 2021, TNT acquired the rights to the U.S. television broadcast. The American radio rights will be held by Sports USA Radio Network, the first in a four-year agreement with Sports USA.

With the game being scheduled for a Saturday night, it aired in Canada under the Hockey Night in Canada banner on Sportsnet.

Notes

References

NHL Winter Classic
Winter Classic
St. Louis Blues games
Minnesota Wild games
Ice hockey competitions in Minneapolis
National Hockey League in Minneapolis–Saint Paul
NHL Winter Classic
2022 in sports in Minnesota
2020s in Minneapolis